Strabane is an unincorporated community in Washington County, Pennsylvania, United States. The community is located along the southern border of Canonsburg and the eastern border of Houston. Strabane has a post office, with ZIP code 15363.

References

Unincorporated communities in Washington County, Pennsylvania
Unincorporated communities in Pennsylvania